Scottish Volleyball is the national governing body for volleyball, beach volleyball and sitting volleyball in Scotland. It is responsible for the development, promotion and delivery of district, national and international volleyball in Scotland. Legally, it is a private company limited by guarantee, with its members acting as its guarantors.

Affiliations
Scottish Volleyball is affiliated with the following organisations:
British Olympic Association (BOA)
British Volleyball Federation (BVF)
Commonwealth Games Scotland (CGS)
Confédération Européenne de Volleyball (CEV)
CEV Small Countries Association (SCA)
Fédération Internationale de Volleyball (FIVB)

Membership
In order to participate as a player, coach or official in a Scottish Volleyball approved competition, to hold an elected office within a member club or to play in a representative national team of Scottish Volleyball, it is necessary to become a member of the Association.

There are several categories of membership:
Tier 1 - players, coaches or officials involved in National Competitions
Tier 2 - players, coaches or officials involved in Local or District Competitions
Tier 3 - players, coaches or officials involved in School Competitions
Associate - a person who is not also a registered player, coach or official.
Club - volleyball clubs based in Scotland
Group - Schools or other organisations in Scotland who play volleyball but are not primarily volleyball clubs
Honorary - awarded to individual members at the discretion of the Board of Directors

Commissions
To assist with the running of the association, the SVA and its board of directors, establish various commissions, typically staffed by volunteer members, each with specific areas of responsibility.  These include:

Beach Commission
Coaches Commission
Competitions Advisory Group
Referees Commission
Student Commission
Youth and Schools Commission
Special Events Commission

National competitions
Each season, Scottish Volleyball organises various senior and junior league and cup competitions. These competitions are governed by the FIVB's Official Volleyball Rules, the FIVB's Official Beach Volleyball Rules and the SVA's Rules of Scottish Volleyball Competitions.

Senior competitions

Scottish Volleyball League (SVL)
Organised volleyball leagues began in Scotland in the 1960s and were known as the National League. The number of divisions and number of teams in each division varied over the years, with the lower divisions sometimes split into East and West.

In season 201516, the National League was renamed the Scottish Volleyball League (SVL), the top division renamed from Division 1 to SVL Premier and the second and third divisions renamed League One and Two.

, there are two divisions in the senior men's and women's SVL.  The teams winning the SVL Premier division gain the title of Scottish Champions and are entitled to enter the CEV Cup the following season.

The divisions are:

Men's SVL Premier
Women's SVL Premier
Men's League One
Women's League One

List of Scottish Champions
The table below lists all Scottish Champions

SVL clubs
, the following clubs have at least one team in the SVL:

Caledonia West
City of Edinburgh
Dundee
Glasgow International
Glasgow Mets
Edinburgh Jets
Lenzie
NUVOC
Shetland
South Ayrshire
Su Ragazzi
University of Edinburgh
Volleyball Aberdeen

John Syer Grand Prix
This competition was introduced in season 2006–07 as the Top Teams Cup, as a means of providing the teams in the top divisions with an increased number of competitive matches against each other.
In 2009–10, it was renamed the John Syer Trophy in honour of the SVA's first Technical Director.
Since 2015–16, it has been known as the John Syer Grand Prix (JSGP).
SVL Premier teams competed in this tournament in the early part of the season, usually on the same dates that lower division teams compete in rounds 1–3 of the Scottish Cup. In the season 2021–22, the tournament was not played.

List of JSGP winners
 the winners of this trophy are as listed in the table below:

Scottish Plate
The Scottish Plate is contested by teams eliminated from the Scottish Cup in rounds 1–3.

List of Scottish Plate winners
Table showing Scottish Plate winners

Scottish Cup
The Scottish Cup is the highest level knockout competition in Scottish volleyball. The first three rounds are organised in small pools. The eight best teams from the pool stages are joined in round 4 by the eight SVL Premier teams. Rounds 4 through to the final are single-leg, knockout rounds. There is an unseeded draw for round 4 which sets the path to the finals. Teams winning the Scottish Cup Final are entitled to enter the CEV Challenge Cup the following season.

List of Scottish Cup winners
Table showing Scottish Cup winners

Junior competitions

Junior SVL (U18)
The top junior league was introduced in the late 1990s and, over the years, varied between an U18 and U19 competition. Until season 201415, it was known as the Junior National League. In season 201516, it was renamed the Junior SVL and, since then, has been an U18 competition.

List of Junior SVL (U18) winners
Table showing Junior SVL (U18) winners

Junior Scottish Cup (U18)
The U18 knockout competition was introduced in season 201213 as the Junior Super Cup and renamed the Junior Scottish Cup in 201516.

List of U18 Junior Scottish Cup winners
Table showing U18 Junior Scottish Cup winners

Junior SVL (U16)
The lower junior league was introduced in season 200607 and, over the years, varied between U15 and U16. Until season 201415 it was known as the Junior National League. In season 201516 it was renamed the Junior SVL and, since then, has been an U16 competition.

List of Junior SVL (U16) winners
Table showing Junior SVL (U16) winners

Junior Scottish Cup (U16)
The U16 Junior Scottish Cup was introduced in season 201516.

List of U16 Junior Scottish Cup winners
Table showing U16 Junior Scottish Cup winners

School competitions
Schools Cup
1968 Coatbridge High School

1996 Stonelaw High School

2016 James Gillespie's High School

Beach competitions
Scottish Beach Tour

Student competitions
Scottish Student Volleyball operates within the constitution of the SVA and is administered and supported by Scottish Student Sport (SSS). The Development Co-ordinator for Scottish Student Volleyball is Paul McPate of the University of Dundee's, Institute of Sport and Exercise.

The following student competitions are organised each year:

Scottish Student Leagues (BUCS Tiers 1A and 2A for women and BUCS Tiers 1A, 2A, and 3A for men)
Scottish Student Cup
Scottish College Finals
SSS Beach Championship
International Student Challenge (Scottish Students National Team)

District competitions
Scottish District Cup

National Team

Scottish Men's National Team (Indoor)

Scottish Women's National Team (Indoor)

Notable events

Interruption of Season 201920
On 13 March 2020, the day before the Scottish Cup and Plate Semi-finals were due to take place, the 201920 season was interrupted as part of the country's response to the COVID-19 pandemic. , an SVA Board decision on the outcome of the season's outstanding competitions was still to be finalised. In May 2020, a final decision was made on the outcome of competitions in the 2019-20 season. The national knockout competitions (Scottish Cup and Scottish Plate) were declared null and void. Winners were declared for Men's and Women's SVL Premier as well as Women's SVL One; no winner was declared for Men's SVL One because there was not a clear enough margin between teams.

References

External links
Scottish Volleyball Association

Scotland
Volleyball in Scotland
Scotland
Volleyball
Volleyball
Volleyball
Volleyball